The Overcreek Dam was an earth-fill embankment dam on Rockyford Creek, a tributary of Gills Creek, in Forest Acres of Richland County, South Carolina. It was breached by flooding on 5 October 2015, due to record rainfall in South Carolina.

References

Dam failures in the United States
Dams in South Carolina
Buildings and structures in Richland County, South Carolina